Frank Shuman (January 23, 1862 – April 28, 1918) was an American inventor, engineer and solar energy pioneer known for his work on solar engines, especially those that used solar energy to heat water that would produce steam.

Career
In 1892 Frank Shuman invented wire glass safety glass. Additional patents were issued relating to the process of making wire glass and machines for making wire glass. In 1914 Shuman invented a process for making laminated safety glass, called safety glass, and manufactured by the Safety Glass Company. In 1916 he patented a "Danger Signal" for railroad crossings, as well as the use of liquid oxygen or liquid air to propel a submarine.

On August 20, 1897, Shuman invented a solar engine that worked by reflecting solar energy onto one-foot square boxes filled with ether, which has a lower boiling point than water, and containing black pipes on the inside, which in turn powered a toy steam engine. The tiny steam engine operated continuously for over two years on sunny days next to a pond at the Shuman house.

In 1908 Shuman formed the Sun Shine Power Company with the intent to build larger power plants. He, along with his technical advisor A.S.E. Ackermann and British physicist Sir Charles Vernon Boys, developed an improved system using mirrors to reflect solar energy upon collector boxes, increasing heating capacity so much that water could now be used instead of ether. He also developed a low-pressure steam turbine, since most 1910 vintage steam engines were built for steam and not sun-heated water. Shuman's turbine processed energy four times faster than any engine of his day. Shuman then constructed a full-scale steam engine that was powered by low-pressure steam, enabling him to patent the entire solar engine system by 1912. Scientific American again featured Shuman in its issues of February 4, 1911 and September 30, 1911.

Shuman built the world’s first solar thermal power station in Maadi, Egypt (1912-1913). Shuman’s plant used semi circle shaped troughs to power a 60-70 horsepower engine that pumped 6,000 gallons of water per minute from the Nile River to adjacent cotton fields. His system included a number of technological improvements, including absorption plates with dual panes separated by a one-inch air space. Although the outbreak of World War I and the discovery of cheap oil in the 1930s discouraged the advancement of solar energy, Shuman’s vision and basic design were resurrected in the 1970s with a new wave of interest in solar thermal energy.

His large home and laboratories still stand in the Tacony section of Philadelphia, as an apartment house and garages. They were added to the historic register in October 2019, meaning they cannot be demolished or significantly altered without the Historical Commission's permission.

Patents

a with Arno Shuman
b with Constantine Shuman
c with Charles Vernon Boys
Source:

Shuman Rediscovered: Hemauer and Keller 
At the 11th International Cairo Biennial of Contemporary Art in 2008-09, the Swiss artists couple Christina Hemauer and Roman Keller drew attention to Shuman's Sun Project. 
Their contribution entitled "No1 Sun Engine" consisted of two parts: apart from a reconstruction of two segments of the solar engines, they built a stand providing information on Shuman's project and on solar energy in general. On the wall behind the information stand, there was a quote (in both English and Arabic) by Shuman: “One thing I feel sure of, and that is that the human race must finally utilize direct sun power or revert to barbarism.” Frank Shuman, 1914

References

Further reading
  This book describes Shuman's solar project in Egypt.
  This book describes Shuman's work in solar power in both the US and Egypt. Includes photos.

19th-century American inventors
20th-century American inventors
1862 births
1918 deaths
People associated with solar power